The Robert A. Lee Stakes is a South Australian Jockey Club Group 3 Thoroughbred horse race for horses aged three years old and over, with set weights with penalties, run over a distance of 1600 metres at Morphettville Racecourse in Adelaide, Australia during the SAJC Autumn Carnival.

History
The inaugural running of the race in 1979 was held at Victoria Park Racecourse. The race is named in honour of South Australian Thoroughbred Racing Hall of Fame inductee Robert A. Lee (2011).

Prior to 2006 the race was run on the Adelaide Cup race day when the race was held in May. When that race was moved to March the Robert A. Lee Stakes was moved to Goodwood Handicap race card.

Grade
1979–2005 - Listed Race
2006 onwards - Group 3

Name
1979–1997 - Robert A. Lee Stakes
 1998 - Pope Packaging Stakes
 1999 - Dr. Lewinn's Stakes
 2000 - Stuart Crystal Handicap
 2001 - Pope Packaging Trophy
2002–2005 - Pope Packaging Stakes
2006–2009 - Gerard Corporation Stakes
 2010 - Alan Scott Stakes
2011 onwards  - Robert A. Lee Stakes

Winners

 2022 - Belle Plaisir
 2021 - Lord Vladivostok
 2020 - Chapel City
 2019 - Fastnet Tempest
 2018 - Land Of Plenty
 2017 - Burning Front
 2016 - Tonopah
 2015 - The Bowler
 2014 - Rhythm To Spare
 2013 - Linton
 2012 - Linton
 2011 - Budriguez
 2010 - Majestic Music
 2009 - Serious Speed
 2008 - Autumn Jeuney
 2007 - Brockman’s Lass
 2006 - Life’s A Bounty
 2005 - Sassbee
 2004 - Fly For Me
 2003 - Sylvaner
 2002 - Sylvaner
 2001 - Typhoon Barney
 2000 - More Action
 1999 - More Action
 1998 - Ben's Rocket
 1997 - Bacy's Brother
 1996 - Jadeva Belle
 1995 - Ruling Knight
 1994 - Master Tambo
 1993 - Leggings
 1992 - Pay The Kings
 1991 - Pacific
 1990 - Neja
 1989 - Blast The Glass
 1988 - Blast The Glass
 1987 - Regal For Me
 1986 - Knight Of Avon
 1985 - Mrs. Fitzherbet
 1984 - Royal Balladeer
 1983 - Writ 'N' Wonder
 1982 - Find The Gold
 1981 - Welkin Light
 1980 - Flanders Fields
 1979 - Lavadina

See also
 List of Australian Group races
 Group races

References

Horse races in Australia
Sport in Adelaide